Kitti Becséri (born 8 January 1993 in Székesfehérvár) is a Hungarian handballer who currently plays for EURONOVEX USE.

Achievements
 Magyar Kupa:
Bronze Medallist: 2011

References

External links
 Career statistics at Worldhandball

1993 births
Living people
Sportspeople from Székesfehérvár
Hungarian female handball players
Fehérvár KC players